Imperial College London's student accommodation comprises 23 halls of residence around West London, primarily South Kensington and North Acton. Accommodation is primarily for first-year undergraduates, although some halls exist for returning students, who may also return as "hall seniors" with operational responsibilities. Halls are run by wardens and subwardens, who are postgraduates or junior academics. Silwood Park halls are postgraduate, but only cater for students studying on site.

The college has in recent years enacted a policy of moving accommodation provision from central London to North Acton. All halls are self-catered.

South Kensington 
Imperial's primary and traditional halls are located on its South Kensington campus. Beit Hall opened as the first hall of residence in 1926, funded by its namesake: Alfred Beit. It is located next to Imperial College Union around the Beit Quadrangle. This was followed by the Prince's Gardens halls, the first of which, Falmouth, Keogh, Selkirk, and Tizard, opened in 1963, and formed Southside Halls. Linstead Hall and the first sport centre followed in 1968. The original Southside and Weeks Halls were Grade II listed in 1993. In 2005 the Prince's Gardens halls were demolished, with the sports centre reopening as Ethos gym in 2006, and Southside Halls reopening in 2007. Weeks hall is no longer used as a hall of residence, but remains as a college building.

North Acton 

The North Acton halls are located away from Imperial's main South Kensington campus. The first buildings to open on the site was the Woodward Buildings, which opened in 2015 and have a rooftop garden. This was followed by the 31-storey Kemp Porter Buildings, which topped out in 2019. There have been local complaints about the appearance of the Woodward Buildings, as well as student complaints about the relocation of accommodation space to Acton.

Wilson House
Wilson House is located near to Edgware Road and Paddington tube stations. Beside the 20 houses facing Sussex Gardens, the Wilson House complex also includes two houses on Southwick Street, and an Annexe located at the back of Wilson House.  Wilson House is a Grade-II listed building.  When not in use as an Imperial student residence from July to September, the hall is converted into a hostel for educational groups visiting London.

Other halls

See also 

 History of Imperial College London
 Halls of residence at University College London

References

Halls of residence
Halls of residence in the United Kingdom